Kevin Moore is an American keyboardist and composer, formerly of Dream Theater.

Kevin Moore may also refer to:

Musicians
Keb' Mo' (Kevin Moore, born 1951), American blues singer, songwriter and guitarist
Luka Bloom (Kevin Barry Moore, born 1955), Irish folk rock singer-songwriter

Sportspeople

Kevin Moore (athlete), Australian and Maltese sprinter
Kevin Moore (Australian rules footballer) (born 1954), Australian rules footballer for Melbourne
Kevin Moore (footballer, born 1956), English football winger for Blackpool, Bury, Newport County, Swindon Town and Swansea City
Kevin Moore (footballer, born 1957), English football midfielder for Shrewsbury Town
Kevin Moore (footballer, born 1958) (1958–2013), English football defender for Grimsby Town, Oldham Athletic, Southampton, Bristol Rovers and Fulham
Kevin Moore (rugby league) (born 1965), Australian rugby league football coach and former player

Others
Kevin Moore (art historian) (born 1964), art historian and curator
Kevin Michael Moore (born 1951), American judge
Michael Kevin Moore (born 1965), Scottish politician
Kevin Moore, presenter of The Moore Show